Boone Township is an inactive township in Wright County, in the U.S. state of Missouri.

Boone Township was named directly or indirectly after frontiersman Daniel Boone. Possibly also named after his son, Nathan Boone, who settled in the area in 1863.

References

Townships in Missouri
Townships in Wright County, Missouri